Zakrzewo  is a village in the administrative district of Gmina Darłowo, within Sławno County, West Pomeranian Voivodeship, in north-western Poland. The sołectwo of Zakrzewo includes two parts known as Zakrzewo Dolne ("Lower Zakrzewo") and Zakrzewo Górne ("Upper Zakrzewo").

For the history of the region, see History of Pomerania.

The village has a population of 201.

References

Zakrzewo